Lorenzo Córdova Vianello (born 6 February 1972) is a Mexican academic who is the Director of the Instituto Nacional Electoral.

Career 
On 3 April 2014, the Chamber of Deputies elected Córdova as the presiding counselor of the National Electoral Institute, for a period of 9 years.

He is a member of the Consejo Nacional de Ciencia y Tecnología.

Bibliography 
 Rights of the Mexican people. 2012 (co-authored with Jorge Sánchez Cordero ).
 Financing of political parties in Latin America. 2011.
 Formation and perspectives of the State in Mexico. 2010.
 Trends of constitutionalism in Ibero-America 2009.

References

See also 
Elections in Mexico

1972 births
Living people
Mexican political scientists
Academic staff of the National Autonomous University of Mexico
National Autonomous University of Mexico alumni